Wendell Silva Lira (born 7 January 1989) is a Brazilian former footballer who played as a striker and current FIFA esports player.

Club career
Wendell started his career at Goiás and was the Campeonato Brasileiro Sub-20 top scorer in 2006, being promoted to the senior squad in the following year. He made his professional debut in a 0–2 away defeat to São Paulo in the Campeonato Brasileiro on May 12, 2007, coming on as a 63rd-minute substitute for Fabrício Carvalho.

In June 2010, he was loaned to Fortaleza of the Campeonato Brasileiro Série C.

On 6 November 2015, it was announced that his goal for Goianésia in a 2–1 win over Atlético-GO was named to the ten-goal shortlist for the FIFA Puskás Award; the goal was later also selected as one of three final contenders for the 2015 FIFA Puskás Award. A free agent at the time of the announcement, he was signed by Vila Nova weeks after. His goal subsequently went on to win the award on 11 January 2016. Wendell received 46.7% of the total votes, ahead of Lionel Messi.

Wendell played for Vila Nova early in the 2016 season, but he was released on 3 May, having failed to score goals for his club.

International career
Wendell Lira played for the Brazil national under-20 football team in a friendly tournament in Japan in 2006, scoring once. He received an offer by AC Milan, which was rejected by Goiás due to his 5-year contract.

Retirement
On 28 July 2016, Wendell announced his retirement from professional football due to persistent injuries, seeking a career as a professional FIFA player and also as a YouTuber.

Career statistics

Club
 (Correct )

eSports
In 2012, Wendell was the Goiás FIFA tournament champion and in November 2015, he was the game's top Brazilian player, which almost qualified him to the 2016 FIFA Interactive World Cup. After winning the 2015 FIFA Puskás Award, he was challenged by 2015 FIWC champion Abdul Aziz Al-Shehri and defeated the Saudi Arabian 6–1, leading to an invite by EA Sports to compete in the 2016 FIWC. In 2019, Wendell joined Sporting CP eSports. In 2021, Wendell was called up to the Brazil national team and will play in the FIFAe Nations Series 2022 South American play-ins.

Honours

Goiás
Campeonato Goiano: 2009

Individual
FIFA Puskás Award: 2015

References

External links
  Guardian Stats Centre
  sambafoot
  zerozero.pt
 (English, Portuguese) WENDELL LIRA REACTION: FIFA Puskas Award winner [FULL] on YouTube
 (English) WINNER – FIFA Puskas Award 2015: Wendell Lira Goal on YouTube

1989 births
Living people
Brazilian footballers
Goiás Esporte Clube players
Sportspeople from Goiânia
Fortaleza Esporte Clube players
Clube Atlético Sorocaba players
Goianésia Esporte Clube players
Associação Atlética Anapolina players
Tombense Futebol Clube players
Vila Nova Futebol Clube players
Association football forwards